Veira may refer to:

 Veira, a historically used name for Wyre, Orkney Islands, Scotland, UK
 Héctor Veira (born 1946), Argentine footballer

See also
 Vera (disambiguation)